The 2001 Kansas State Wildcats football team represented Kansas State University in the 2001 NCAA Division I-A football season.  The team's head coach was Bill Snyder.  The Wildcats played their home games in KSU Stadium.  2001 saw the Wildcats finish with a record of 6–6, and a 3–5 record in Big 12 Conference play.  The season culminated with a loss to Syracuse in the 2001 Insight.com Bowl.

Schedule

Game summaries

at #3 Oklahoma

at Texas Tech

Texas A&M

at Nebraska

Statistics

Score by quarter

Team

Offense

Rushing

Passing

Receiving

References

Kansas State
Kansas State Wildcats football seasons
Kansas State Wildcats football